The 2014–15 Women's National Cricket League season was the 19th season of the Women's National Cricket League, the women's domestic limited overs cricket competition in Australia. The tournament started on 11 October 2014 and finished on 25 January 2015. For the second (after 2012–13) and last time, the tournament included semi-finals, with the top four teams on the ladder advancing. New South Wales Breakers won the tournament for the 17th time after finishing only fourth on the ladder and beating South Australian Scorpions in the final.  Jess Jonassen was named player of the series in recognition of her fine early season performance, before she was sidelined for the second half of the season by a knee injury.

Ladder

Fixtures

Round-robin phase

Knockout phase

Overview

Semi Final 1

Semi Final 2

Final

Statistics

Highest totals

Most runs

Most wickets

References

Notes

Bibliography

External links
 Series home at ESPNcricinfo

 
Women's National Cricket League seasons
 
Women's National Cricket League